Enrico Antonio Giorgio Spinetti (born 31 March 1951) is a Welsh session drummer whose playing has featured on many prominent rock and pop albums.

Career
Spinetti was born in Cwm, near Ebbw Vale, Monmouthshire, Wales. His first band, aged about 12 or 13, was The Toby Four (named after Toby beer), which rehearsed in the Ambray Hotel and played songs by The Shadows, amongst others. He then joined another group called The Choice from Tredegar, with a guitarist influenced by Jimi Hendrix. After this he got into a group in Cardiff called The Clockwork Motion, which played as far afield as Newcastle and Birmingham, with Spinetti playing a Premier Black Pearl drum kit. He then secured an audition for a London band Floribunda Rose. He travelled to London, with his drums, on the train, and went to the band's flat in Earls Court; he played four or five numbers and got the job. The band became Scrugg and went to  the Top 10 Club in Hamburg.

Spinetti began his recording career with Scrugg, which recorded on the Pye label. Band members included fellow Welshman Jack Russell, Christos Demetriou and the South African singer-songwriter, John Kongos. In the early 1970s, Spinetti appeared with Kongos on BBC Television's Top of the Pops performing Kongos' chart hit single, "He's Gonna Step on You Again". After leaving Scrugg, Spinetti's early work included spells with The Herd and Judas Jump, who were the opening act at the Isle of Wight Festival 1970. The line-up of The Herd and Judas Jump included Andy Bown, who later joined Status Quo. He was a member of the UK band Hustler which released two albums - High Street (1974) and Play Loud (1975), the latter of which was produced by Roy Thomas Baker.

Spinetti played on eight of the ten tracks on Gerry Rafferty's album City to City (including the hit "Baker Street"), and also played in the 2002 memorial concert for George Harrison, "The Concert For George". In 2011 Spinetti recorded with Andy Bown again, playing drums on Bown's solo album "Unfinished Business". Spinetti was a member of Eric Clapton's touring band in the 2010s.

Recording credits
Spinetti's recording credits include the following:

With Joan Armatrading
 Whatever's for Us (Cube Records, 1972)
 Show Some Emotion (A&M Records, 1977)
 To the Limit (A&M Records, 1978)

With Eric Clapton
 Just One Night (Polydor, 1980)
 Another Ticket (RSO Records, 1981)
 August (Warner Bros. Records, 1986)
 Old Sock (Surfdog Records, 2013)
 I Still Do (Surfdog Records, 2016)                                                                                                                                                                                                                                                                                                                                                                                                                                                                                                                                                                                                                          
With Roger Daltrey
 Ride a Rock Horse (Track Records, 1975)

With Bob Dylan
 Down in the Groove (Columbia Records, 1988)

With Roger Chapman
 Chappo (Arista Records, 1979)
 Hybrid and Lowdown (Polydor Records, 1990) 

With George Harrison
 Gone Troppo (Dark Horse Records, 1982)

With Paul McCartney 
 CHOBA B CCCP (Melodiya, 1988)

With Katie Melua
 Call off the Search (Dramatico, 2003)
 Piece by Piece (Dramatico, 2005)
 Pictures (Dramatico, 2007)
 The House (Dramatico, 2010)
 Secret Symphony (Dramatico, 2012)
 Ketevan (Dramatico, 2013)

With Gerry Rafferty 
 Can I Have My Money Back? (Line Records, 1972)
 City to City (United Artists Records, 1978)

With Cliff Richard 
 Stronger (EMI, 1989)

With Leo Sayer
 Silverbird (Chrysalis Records, 1973)

With Pete Townshend and Ronnie Lane
 Rough Mix (MCA, 1977)

With Bonnie Tyler
 Diamond Cut (RCA Records, 1978)

With Bill Wyman
 Groovin' (Roadrunner Records, 2000)

Personal life
He is the younger brother of actor Victor Spinetti (1929–2012). He married Susan Styles in Coventry, Warwickshire, England in 2004..

References

External links
Work with Procol Harum & Gary Brooker
The Musician's Olympus

1951 births
Living people
People from Ebbw Vale
Musicians from Cardiff
Welsh rock drummers
Welsh session musicians
Welsh people of Italian descent
Italian British musicians
The Herd (British band) members